The House of Whispers is a lost 1920 American silent mystery film directed by Ernest C. Warde and starring J. Warren Kerrigan, Joseph J. Dowling and Fritzi Brunette.

Cast
 J. Warren Kerrigan as Spaulding Nelson 
 Joseph J. Dowling as Rufus Gaston 
 Fritzi Brunette as Barbara Bradford 
 Margery Wilson as Clara Bradford 
 Myrtle Rishell as Mrs. Bradford 
 Herbert Prior as Edward Thayer 
 Miles McCarthy as Henry Kent
 Claire Du Brey as Nettie Kelly 
 Fred C. Jones as Roldo

References

Bibliography
 Goble, Alan. The Complete Index to Literary Sources in Film. Walter de Gruyter, 1999.

External links

1920 films
1920 mystery films
American mystery films
Films directed by Ernest C. Warde
Lost American films
American silent feature films
1920s English-language films
Pathé Exchange films
American black-and-white films
Films distributed by W. W. Hodkinson Corporation
1920 lost films
Lost mystery films
1920s American films
Silent mystery films